Cedar Ridge is a census-designated place (CDP) in Tuolumne County, California. The 2010 United States census reported Cedar Ridge's population was 1,132.

Cedar Ridge was created a CDP for the 2010 census, previously it was part of the Phoenix Lake-Cedar Ridge CDP.

Geography
According to the United States Census Bureau, the CDP covers an area of 7.8 square miles (20.2 km2), 99.89% of it land and 0.11% of it water.

Demographics
The 2010 United States Census reported that Cedar Ridge had a population of 1,132. The racial makeup of Cedar Ridge was 1,066 (94.2%) White, 3 (0.3%) African American, 6 (0.5%) Native American, 5 (0.4%) Asian, 1 (0.1%) Pacific Islander, 5 (0.4%) from other races, and 46 (4.1%) from two or more races. Hispanic or Latino of any race were 71 persons (6.3%).

The Census reported that 1,073 people (94.8% of the population) lived in households, 59 (5.2%) lived in non-institutionalized group quarters, and 0 (0%) were institutionalized.

There were 456 households, out of which 105 (23.0%) had children under the age of 18 living in them, 281 (61.6%) were opposite-sex married couples living together, 27 (5.9%) had a female householder with no husband present, 28 (6.1%) had a male householder with no wife present.  There were 18 (3.9%) unmarried opposite-sex partnerships, and 2 (0.4%) same-sex married couples or partnerships. 95 households (20.8%) were made up of individuals, and 34 (7.5%) had someone living alone who was 65 years of age or older. The average household size was 2.35.  There were 336 families (73.7% of all households); the average family size was 2.67.

The population was spread out, with 197 people (17.4%) under the age of 18, 77 people (6.8%) aged 18 to 24, 150 people (13.3%) aged 25 to 44, 471 people (41.6%) aged 45 to 64, and 237 people (20.9%) who were 65 years of age or older.  The median age was 52.2 years. For every 100 females, there were 106.6 males.  For every 100 females age 18 and over, there were 107.3 males.

The homeowner vacancy rate was 4.9%; the rental vacancy rate was 10.1%.  886 people (78.3% of the population) lived in owner-occupied housing units and 187 people (16.5%) lived in rental housing units.

References

Census-designated places in Tuolumne County, California
Populated places in the Sierra Nevada (United States)